William Lewis Leadbetter is an Australian politician and historian. He was a Labor member of the Western Australian Legislative Council for East Metropolitan since 4 April 2017, when he was elected in a countback following the resignation of Amber-Jade Sanderson. His term concluded on 21 May 2017, when the new Legislative Council elected at the 2017 state election took its seats.

Leadbetter was born in Sydney, and has been a university lecturer in history in Western Australia since 1998. He previously contested the federal seats of Pearce in 2010 and Hasluck in 2016.

References

Year of birth missing (living people)
Living people
Members of the Western Australian Legislative Council
Australian Labor Party members of the Parliament of Western Australia
21st-century Australian politicians